Sila (Arabic: سعلى أو سعلا أو سعلاة alternatively spelled Si'la or called Si'lat literally: "Hag" or "treacherous spirits of invariable form" pl. Sa'aali adj: سعلوة su'luwwa) is a supernatural creature assigned to the jinn or ghouls in Arabian folklore. These spirits are classified as being one of the most malicious class of jinn. They are described as talented shapeshifters often appearing in human form and female. Despite their impressive shapeshifting abilities, they can be discovered by their hybrid appearances of animals.

Accordingly, Si'lat are said to live in the desolate parts of the desert where they lead travellers and nomads astray, leading them to their deaths. They are also said to seduce and marry men or even give birth to a child from a relationship between human and jinn.

Silas are usually female and aligned to intercourse and a type of magical jinn, not all of them are succubi or female.

"Banu Si'lat" (children of Si'lat myth) 
In pre-Islamic Arab countries, there was said to be one man who fell in love with a si'lat and had children who are known as "Banu Si'lat" It was rumored that the Arab population was conceived from descendants of 'Amr ibn Yarbu's' children who were half-si'lat. Their mother was said to have left her family behind after seeing lightning in the sky, interpreting this as a sign to return to her clan. According to Iraqi historian, Mahmud Shukri al-Alusi, Arabs refer to si'lats as women who are said to be slim, witty, powerful and accused of being unloyal seductresses.

See also 

 Succubus - A similar being in European and Jewish mythology
 Churel - A similar being in mythology from the Indian Subcontinent

References 

Folklore
Jinn
Female legendary creatures
Arabian legendary creatures
Jinniyyat
Ghouls